Benjamin J. Gibson (November 13, 1882 – July 8, 1949) was an American politician and lawyer.

Born in Adams County, Iowa, Gibson went to the public schools in Adams County. He graduated from University of Nebraska–Lincoln in 1906 and was admitted to the Iowa bar. Gibson practiced law in Corning, Iowa. He served in the Iowa State Senate in 1917 and was a Republican. During World War I, Gibson served in the United States Army and was commissioned captain. From 1921 to 1927, Gibson served as Iowa Attorney General. He moved to Des Moines, Iowa, and continued to practice law. Gibson died in Rochester, Minnesota, after having stomach surgery.

Notes

1882 births
1949 deaths
People from Corning, Iowa
Politicians from Des Moines, Iowa
Military personnel from Iowa
University of Nebraska–Lincoln alumni
Iowa lawyers
Iowa Attorneys General
Republican Party Iowa state senators
20th-century American politicians
20th-century American lawyers